Derek Haas (born May 1, 1955) is a retired professional ice hockey player who played 30 games in the World Hockey Association with the Calgary Cowboys during the 1975–76 WHA season. Haas also played for the Springfield Indians.

From 1982 to 1995, Haas played in the Ligue Magnus in France and became a French citizen as a result, playing for the country in the 1988 Winter Olympics.

External links

References 

1955 births
Calgary Cowboys players
French ice hockey centres
Ice hockey players at the 1988 Winter Olympics
Living people
Olympic ice hockey players of France
Springfield Indians players
Tidewater Sharks players
Victoria Cougars (WHL) players
Ours de Villard-de-Lans players
Canadian emigrants to France